The 2021 Offaly Senior Hurling Championship was the 123rd staging of the Offaly Senior Hurling Championship since its establishment by the Offaly County Board in 1896. The group stage placings were confirmed on 28 May 2021. The championship began on 28 August 2021 and ended on 21 November 2021.

St Rynagh's were the defending champions. Drumcullen and Kinnitty joined the championship as the number of participating teams increased from eight to ten.

The final was played on 21 November 2021 at Bord na Móna O'Connor Park in Tullamore, between St Rynagh's and Coolderry, in what was their first meeting in a final in six years. St Rynagh's won the match by 1-11 to 0-12 to claim their 20th championship title overall and a third title in succession.

Results

Group stage

Relegation stage

Playoff

Knockout stage

Semi-finals

Final

References

Offaly Senior Hurling Championship
Offaly Senior Hurling Championship
Offaly Senior Hurling Championship